In 2007, Marsalis Music Honors Bob French was released as part of the Marsalis music Honors series. The album's musicians include Harry Connick, Jr. on piano and Branford Marsalis on saxophone.

Track listing

 "Bourbon Street Parade" (Paul Barbarin) - 8:20
 "Basin Street Blues" (Spencer Williams) - 5:58
 "Way Down Yonder in New Orleans" (Henry Creamer, Turner Layton) - 5:58
 "Milenburg Joys" (Paul Mares, Walter Melrose, Fred "Jelly Roll" Morton, Leon Roppolo) - 8:28
 "You Are My Sunshine" (Jimmie Davis) - 3:54
 "Burgundy Street Blues" (George Lewis) - 6:30
 "When It's Sleepy Time Down South" (Clarence Muse, Leon Rene, Otis South Rene) - 9:21
 "Royal Garden Blues" (Clarence Williams, Spencer Williams) - 5:41
 "Do You Know What It Means (To Miss New Orleans)" (Louis Alter, Eddie DeLange) - 6:54
 "Just a Closer Walk with Thee" (traditional) - 7:51
 "When the Saints (Go Marching In)" (traditional) - 7:23

Personnel

 Bob French - drums, vocals
 Troy Andrews - trombone
 Leonard Brown - trumpet
 Harry Connick, Jr. - piano
 Edward Huntington - banjo
 Branford Marsalis - saxophone
 Chris Severin - bass
 Ellen Smith - vocals

Reception
AllMusic 
The Gazette 
New York Times (Favorable)
offBeat (Favorable)
Philadelphia Daily News A

References

2007 albums
Rounder Records albums